Shcherbakov or Scherbakov, feminine: Shcherbakova or Scherbakova (Щербако́ва), is a Russian surname. It may refer to:

Surname
 Albert Shcherbakov (born 1976), Russian footballer
 Aleksandr Shcherbakov (born 1998), Russian footballer
  (1925–2013), Soviet aircraft pilot and Hero of the Soviet Union
 Aleksandr Shcherbakov (1901–1945), Soviet statesman and politician
  (born 1955), Russian diplomat
 Andrey Shcharbakow (known in Russian as Andrey Scherbakov) (born 1991), Belarusian footballer
 Anna Shcherbakova (born 2004), Russian figure skater
 Boris Shcherbakov (born 1949), Russian actor
 Denis Scherbakov (born 1978), Belarusian football referee
 Denys Shcherbakov (born 1988), Ukrainian orienteer
 Fedor Shcherbakov (1947–2022), Russian-Kazakh Lieutenant General
 Ihor Shcherbakov (born 1955), Ukrainian composer
 Konstantin Scherbakov (born 1963), Russian pianist
 Konstantin Shcherbakov (born 1997), Russian footballer
 Leonid Shcherbakov (born 1927), Soviet athlete
 Leonid Ivanovich Shcherbakov (1936–2021), Soviet general and Hero of the Russian Federation
 Mikhail Shcherbakov (born 1963), Russian singer-songwriter
 Oleg Shcherbakov (born 1966), Russian footballer
 Oleksandr Shcherbakov (born 1960), Ukrainian footballer
 Pyotr Shcherbakov (1929–1992), Soviet actor
 Ruslan Shcherbakov (born 1969), Russian chess player
  (born 1955), Soviet sculptor
 Sergei Scherbakov (1918–1994), Russian boxer
 Sergey Shcherbakov (1962–1988), Soviet serial killer
 Serhiy Scherbakov (born 1971), Ukrainian footballer
 Svetlana Shcherbakova (born 1988), Russian weightlifter
 Vadim Shcherbakov (fl. 1966–1991), Soviet military advisor to North Vietnam
 Vasily Shcherbakov (born 1969), Russian musician and professor, grand-nephew of the composer Dmitry Kabalevsky
 Vladimir Shcherbakov (1945–1993), Soviet footballer
 Vladimir Shcherbakov (1901–1981), Soviet general
 Vladimir Shcherbakov (1909–1985), Soviet scientist and politician
 Yury Shcherbakov (born 1925), Soviet javelin thrower
 Yevgeni Shcherbakov (born 1986), Russian footballer

Other
 Name of Rybinsk, Russia from 1946 to 1957
 Shcherbakov Range, a mountain range in Antarctica
 Shcherbakov Shche-2, a World War II era Soviet utility aircraft

See also
 
 Shcherba
 Shcherbak
 Shcherbachov

Russian-language surnames